"Here (For Christmas)" is a song by Danish pop and soul band Lukas Graham. It was released on 8 November 2019 by Copenhagen Records and Then We Take the World. The song peaked at number twenty-three on the Danish Singles Chart.

Background
Talking about the song, Lukas Forchhammer said, "'HERE (For Christmas)' is about William, my childhood friend, who is no longer with us. He was renovating this beautiful old boat, but he never got to put it in the water. That boat is a metaphor for all the things I wish I could do with Willy, my dad and all the others that are here no more."

Lyric video
A lyric video to accompany the release of "Here (For Christmas)" was first released on YouTube on 7 November 2019. The video shows photos from Forchhammer's childhood with William and other loved ones.

Credits and personnel
Credits adapted from Tidal.

 Zach Skelton – production, bass guitar, drums, guitar, keyboard, programmer, songwriting
 David LaBrel – Glockenspiel, songwriting
 Jake Torrey – Guitar, keyboard, songwriting
 Randy Merrill – Masterer
 Mark "Spike" Stent – Mixer
 Lukas Forchhammer – Songwriting

Charts

Certifications

Release history

References

2019 singles
2019 songs
Lukas Graham songs
Songs written by Zach Skelton
Songs written by Lukas Forchhammer
Copenhagen Records singles